Lise Skjåk Bræk (born Marie Elisabeth Bræk, 7 November 1941) is a Norwegian textile artist, known for her works within ceremonial apparel, uniforms, costumes, rugs, and other textiles.  She is a resident of Trondheim.

She is the daughter of former minister of industry in Norway, Ola Skjåk Bræk, and Ingeborg Bræk, a noted activist for humanitarian causes.

References

External links
 The family tree of Lise Skjåk Bræk on Geni.com

Norwegian artists
Living people
1941 births
People from Trondheim
Norwegian Association for Women's Rights people
Women textile artists